Janis Carter (born Janis Elinore Dremann, October 10, 1913 – July 30, 1994) was an American stage and film actress who performed throughout the 1940s and into the 1950s. During the mid-1950s, she began working regularly on television, co-hosting with Bud Collyer the NBC daytime game show Feather Your Nest.

Early years
Carter was born Janis Elinore Dremann in Cleveland, Ohio. When she started her professional career, Dremann changed her last name to Carter, because people had trouble pronouncing and spelling Dremann, so she chose her grandmother's maiden name as her new last name.

After initial training as a pianist, Carter changed to singing when she was eight years old. Her elementary and secondary education was provided by schools in East Cleveland, Ohio. After that, she attended Western Reserve University, graduating with two degrees — bachelor of arts and bachelor of music. She also participated in dramatics in college.

Career

After attending Mather College in Cleveland, Ohio, Carter headed to New York in an attempt to start a career in opera. Although that goal was  unsuccessful, when she was subsequently working on Broadway she was spotted on stage by Darryl F. Zanuck, who signed her to a movie deal. Her Broadway credits included Du Barry Was a Lady (1939), Virginia (1937), and Panama Hattie (1940).

After moving to Hollywood, she appeared in over 30 films beginning in 1941 for 20th Century Fox, MGM, Columbia, and RKO. She appeared in the films Night Editor (1946) and Framed (1947) with Glenn Ford, and Flying Leathernecks (1951) with John Wayne. After leaving Los Angeles, Carter returned to New York and found work in television in comedies and dramas and as hostess for the quiz show Feather Your Nest opposite Bud Collyer.

Personal life and death
Carter married Carl Prager, a musician and composer, in 1942, but they divorced nine years later. In 1956, she wed Julius Stulman, a New York lumber and shipping tycoon. After their marriage, she retired from show business. The couple remained together until 1994, when Carter, at age 80, died from a heart attack in Durham, North Carolina.

Partial filmography

Cadet Girl (1941) - Mary Moore
Secret Agent of Japan (1942) - Doris Poole
Who Is Hope Schuyler? (1942) - Vesta Hadden
I Married an Angel (1942) - Sufi
Just Off Broadway (1942) - Lillian Hubbard
Girl Trouble (1942) - Virginia
Thunder Birds (1942) - Blonde Red Cross Nurse Trainee
That Other Woman (1942) - Constance Powell
Lady of Burlesque (1943) - Janine
Swing Out the Blues (1943) - Dena Marshall
The Ghost That Walks Alone (1944) - Enid Turner
The Girl in the Case (a.k.a. The Silver Key) (1944) - Myra Warner
The Mark of the Whistler ( The Marked Man) (1944) - Patricia Henley
One Mysterious Night (1944) - Dorothy Anderson
The Missing Juror (1944) - Alice Hill
Together Again (1944) - Miss Thorn (uncredited)
The Power of the Whistler (1945) - Jean Lang
A Thousand and One Nights (1945) - Harem Girl (uncredited)
The Fighting Guardsman (1946) - Christine Roualt
One Way to Love (1946) - Josie Hart
The Notorious Lone Wolf (1946) - Carla Winter
Night Editor (a.k.a. The Trespasser) (1946) - Jill Merrill
Framed (1947) - Paula Craig
I Love Trouble (1948) - Ligia Caprillo aka Jane Breeger aka Janie Joy
Slightly French (1949) - Louisa Gayle
Addio Mimí! (1949) - Jeanette
Her Wonderful Lie (1948)
Miss Grant Takes Richmond (1949) - Peggy Donato
I Married a Communist (a.k.a. The Woman on Pier 13) (1949) - Christine Norman
And Baby Makes Three (1950) - Wanda York
A Woman of Distinction (1950) - Teddy Evans
Santa Fe (1951) - Judith Chandler
My Forbidden Past (1951) - Corinne Lucas
Flying Leathernecks (1951) - Joan Kirby
The Half-Breed (1952) - Helen Dowling
The Sergeant and the Spy (1953) (in German)
Double Profile (1954) (in German)

References

External links

 
 
 Photos of Janis Carter in 'A Thousand and One Nights' by Ned Scott

1913 births
1994 deaths
20th-century American actresses
20th-century American singers
20th-century American women singers
American film actresses
American stage actresses
American television personalities
Actresses from Cleveland
Case Western Reserve University alumni